Anemone occidentalis, the white pasqueflower or western pasqueflower, is a herbaceous species of flowering plant in the buttercup family Ranunculaceae. Other authorities place it in the genus Pulsatilla. Leaves have villous hairs and their margins are pinnatifid or dissected. Plants flower briefly mid-spring to mid-summer, usually soon after the ground is exposed by melting snow. The flowers are composed of five to seven sepals (sometimes called tepals), normally white or soft purple, also mixed white and blueish purple, one flower per stem. Flowers have 150–200 stamens. Generally, the fruit persists into fall.

Native to far western North America including British Columbia to California and Montana, it is found growing in gravelly soils on slopes and in moist meadows.

Chemistry

Western pasqueflower likely contains ranunculin and protoanemonin, an irritant glycoside and its aglycone, as these are seen in most members of this genus and the plant's latex is irritating. It can be fatal to domestic animals, particularly to sheep, and should thus not be eaten by humans.

Traditional medicine

The fresh stems and seeds of the plant are used traditionally in North America as analgesics, anxiolytics, and sedatives.

Landmarks
Pulsatilla Pass in Banff National Park is named after this species.

Image gallery

References

External links

occidentalis
Flora of Western Canada
Flora of the Northwestern United States
Flora of the Southwestern United States